The Piedmontese regional election of 1990 took place on 6 and 7 May 1990.

Events
Christian Democracy and the Italian Communist Party lost many votes, especially to the regionalist parties and the Greens. After the election Christian Democrat Gian Paolo Brizio formed a government comprising the Italian Socialist Party, the Italian Liberal Party, the Italian Republican Party and the Italian Democratic Socialist Party (Pentapartito).

In 1994, following the Tangentopoli-crisis and the dissolution of Christian Democracy, Brizio, who had joined to the Italian People's Party, formed a new government which included the Democratic Party of the Left, successor party of the Communists, and the Socialists.

Results 

Source: Ministry of the Interior

Elections in Piedmont
1990 elections in Italy